Pachgaon is a census town in Kolhapur district in the Indian state of Maharashtra.

Demographics
 India census, Pachgaon had a population of 11,913. Males constitute 53% of the population and females 47%. Pachgaon has an average literacy rate of 78%, higher than the national average of 59.5%: male literacy is 82%, and female literacy is 74%. In Pachgaon, 12% of the population is under 6 years of age.

See also
 Pachgaon (Manesar)

References

Cities and towns in Kolhapur district